Hajjiabad-e Kuh Payeh (also Romanized as Ḩājjīābād-e Kūh Pāyeh) is a village in Chaharkuh Rural District, in the Central District of Kordkuy County, Golestan Province, Iran. At the 2006 census, its population was 230, in 64 families.

References 

Populated places in Kordkuy County